

Lodge Hill railway station was a station on the Bristol and Exeter Railway's Cheddar Valley line in Somerset, England from 1870 until 1963. The station served the village of Westbury-sub-Mendip, but was not named Westbury because of the potential for confusion with Westbury, Wiltshire.

History
The station was opened with the extension of the broad gauge line from Cheddar to Wells in April 1870, converted to standard gauge in the mid-1870s and then linked up to the East Somerset Railway to provide through services from Yatton to Witham in 1878. All the railways involved were absorbed into the Great Western Railway in the 1870s.

The station was host to a GWR camping coach from 1938 to 1939. A camping coach was also positioned here by the Western Region in 1952.

The Yatton to Witham line closed to passengers in 1963, though goods traffic passed through to Cheddar until 1969.

After closure
For a period Bristol Grammar School used the station buildings as an activity centre, but it was later demolished to make way for housing. Stone from the building was used in the construction of buildings at Cranmore on the preserved East Somerset Railway.

Until 2002, the former track bed at the station was used as an airfield for light aircraft.

References

Further reading
 
 Historic railway sign is on track for museum arrival, Bristol Evening Post, 19 December 2006

External links
 Lodge Hill station on navigable 1946 O. S. map
 

Lodge Hill
Railway stations in Great Britain opened in 1870
Railway stations in Great Britain closed in 1963
Beeching closures in England
Former Great Western Railway stations